Kim Chang-Jong is a former Justice of the Constitutional Court of Korea

Career 
1985            Judge, Daegu District Court

1990            Judge, Gyeongju Branch of Daegu District Court

1992            Judge, Daegu High Court

1995            Judge Daegu District Court

1996            Chief Judge, Uiseong Branch of Daegu District Court

1997            Senior Judge, Daegu District Court

2001            Chief Judge, Gimcheon Branch of Daegu District Court

2003            Senior Judge, Daegu District Court

2005            Senior Judge, Daegu High Court

2009            Chief Senior Judge, Daegu District Court

2010            Chief Senior Judge, Daegu High Court

2012            Chief Judge, Daegu District Court

Current   Justice, Constitutional Court (since Sep. 20, 2012)

References 

South Korean judges
Justices of the Constitutional Court of Korea
Living people
1957 births